Stanah Primary School (formerly Stanah County Primary School and Stanah Community Primary School) is an English mixed primary school located in the Stanah area of Thornton, Lancashire.

Built in the 1960s, the school, located on Lambs Road (or, as it is known locally, Lambs Hill), has around 400 pupils, aged 4 to 11. Its head teacher is H. M. Clough. He replaced Ian Todd who, after three-and-a-half years as head, took up a position at the University of Cumbria in January 2010.  Mr. Todd's predecessor was Tony Ford, who retired in the summer of 2006 after twelve years in the role. One of the earlier and long-serving head teachers was Jean Fisher. Another was Mr. Evans, who was headmaster in the 1970s.

The school comprises two separate prefabricated buildings. A smaller annex (infants) is attended by the foundation class and years 1 and 2. For year 3, the children move into the larger main building (juniors). The smaller building was mothballed in the early 1980s when school rolls dropped, but it was renovated and reopened around a decade later. The infants building also houses a preschool nursery originally called Stanah Sunflowers but which was then bought and renamed to Oak Tree Nursery.

On the junior's building stands the school's distinctive chimney.

Notable people

The Krankies (pictured) visited Stanah for a summer fair in the early 1980s. Leslie Crowther also visited around the same time. Jazz musician Dan Forshaw attended the school from 1988 to 1992, and it was in the school wind band that he first picked up his instrument. The school has also been visited by multiple authors, including Hazel Townson and Dan Worsley.

References
Specific

General

External links
 Stanah Community Primary School's official website
 Stanah's profile page at Ofsted

Primary schools in Lancashire
Schools in the Borough of Wyre
Community schools in Lancashire